The Maram people, also known as the Maram Naga, are a Tibeto-Burmese Naga ethnic group inhabiting the large portion of Senapati district in the Northeast Indian state of Manipur.

Demographics 

Marams are mainly found in the Senapti district of Manipur. According to the 1992 figures, the Maram Khullen was the largest village of Marams, followed by Willong.

Culture 
The Marams are known for wet-rice cultivation on terraces of the hill slopes and the very small alluvial plain of the flat landform created by the deposition of sediment  near river areas because of this labor-intensive cultivation, land is the most important form of property among them. This allows them to cultivate the same plot year after year however, to a small extent, on slash-and-burn cultivation is still done in small pocket mainly by the marams settled in southern region.

References

Bibliography 

 

Naga people
Scheduled Tribes of Manipur
Ethnic groups in Northeast India
Ethnic groups in South Asia